Newbury is a rural community in Palmerston North City and Manawatu District, in the Manawatū-Whanganui region in New Zealand's central North Island.

It includes the intersection of State Highway 3 between Palmerston North and Sanson, and State Highway 54 between Palmerston North and Feilding.

History

The area was settled by English farmers in the late 19th century. Many settlers in the area, including the Gore family, were from Newbury, Berkshire.

The Newbury Country Women's Institute was established by women in the community in 1934. By 2014, it had changed its name to the Newbury Women's Institute and had 23 members aged 65 to 89.

In 2015, a driver was sentenced to community work over a fatal accident at the intersection of Newbury and Roberts Lines. The judge noted that roads in the area are very busy during rush hour due to the large number of people commuting into Palmerston North.

Demographics

The Newbury statistical area covers  within Palmerston North, including Bunnythorpe and Longburn, but does not include the parts of Newbury in the Manawatu District, which are covered in Kauwhata. Newbury had a population of 1,905 at the 2018 New Zealand census, an increase of 9 people (0.5%) since the 2013 census, and an increase of 99 people (5.5%) since the 2006 census. There were 666 households. There were 963 males and 942 females, giving a sex ratio of 1.02 males per female. The median age was 39.7 years (compared with 37.4 years nationally), with 384 people (20.2%) aged under 15 years, 366 (19.2%) aged 15 to 29, 906 (47.6%) aged 30 to 64, and 246 (12.9%) aged 65 or older.

Ethnicities were 89.3% European/Pākehā, 18.0% Māori, 2.4% Pacific peoples, 3.0% Asian, and 1.7% other ethnicities (totals add to more than 100% since people could identify with multiple ethnicities).

The proportion of people born overseas was 9.0%, compared with 27.1% nationally.

Although some people objected to giving their religion, 56.7% had no religion, 32.8% were Christian, 0.5% were Hindu, 0.6% were Muslim, 0.2% were Buddhist and 2.5% had other religions.

Of those at least 15 years old, 231 (15.2%) people had a bachelor or higher degree, and 324 (21.3%) people had no formal qualifications. The median income was $36,100, compared with $31,800 nationally. The employment status of those at least 15 was that 855 (56.2%) people were employed full-time, 246 (16.2%) were part-time, and 51 (3.4%) were unemployed.

Education

The school is a semi-rural school, with a mix of rural and urban students. A Sunday Star Times investigation in 2016 found 39% of students were coming from out of the local school intake zone, compared to 11% nationally and 22% in the Manawatū-Whanganui Region.

Former deputy principal Adrienne 'Bud' Christensen has written a children's book for pre-schoolers on adjusting to primary school. She said she during her time the school, she had not found a book that"warmly introduces young readers to the wonderful world of primary school and helps them acclimatise to the school environment".

The school has introduced a wētā hotel, native bush, shade trees and vegetable gardens, as part of the Horizons Regional Council "enviroschools" programme.

The school takes part in Pink Shirt Day, an annual day in which students dress in pink to show their opposition to bullying.

References

Populated places in Manawatū-Whanganui
Suburbs of Palmerston North
Manawatu District